Heinz Manfred Becher (born 4 September 1933) is a West German rower who represented the United Team of Germany. He competed at the 1960 Summer Olympics in Rome with the men's double sculls where they were eliminated in the round one repechage.

References

1933 births
Living people
People from Worms, Germany
People from Rhenish Hesse
West German male rowers
Sportspeople from Rhineland-Palatinate
Olympic rowers of the United Team of Germany
Rowers at the 1960 Summer Olympics